Roman Kononenko (born 13 April 1981) is a Ukrainian former track cyclist.

Major results

2002
 1st  Team pursuit, European Under–23 Track Championships
 World Cup Classics
2nd Team pursuit, Moscow 
2003
 1st  Team pursuit, European Under–23 Track Championships
2004
 2004–05 World Cup Classics
1st Team pursuit, Moscow
2nd Team pursuit, Los Angeles
2005
 2005–06 World Cup Classics
3rd Team pursuit, Moscow
2006
 3rd Team pursuit, World Track Championships
 2006–07 World Cup Classics
3rd Team pursuit, Sydney
2007
 2nd Team pursuit, World Track Championships
2008
 1st Stage 4 Thüringen Rundfahrt der U23
 2008–09 World Cup Classics
3rd Team pursuit, Melbourne
2009
 2009–10 World Cup Classics
3rd Individual pursuit, Manchester

References

External links

1981 births
Living people
Ukrainian male cyclists
Cyclists at the 2004 Summer Olympics
Olympic cyclists of Ukraine
Sportspeople from Simferopol
Ukrainian track cyclists